Bonifels is a historic home located at Ridgway Township in Elk County, Pennsylvania.  It was built in 1898 by N.T. Arnold and is a large -story, "T" shaped stone mansion.  It features hipped roofs with hipped roofed dormers, a conical tower, and a crenellated stone tower.  It is owned by the Elk County Country Club.

It was added to the National Register of Historic Places in 1978.

References

Houses on the National Register of Historic Places in Pennsylvania
Houses completed in 1898
Houses in Elk County, Pennsylvania
National Register of Historic Places in Elk County, Pennsylvania